University of Northern California may refer to:
University of Northern California (Petaluma), a private university in Petaluma, California focused on engineering
University of Northern California, Lorenzo Patiño School of Law, a private law school in Sacramento, California